This is a list of the first women lawyer(s) and judge(s) in Africa. It includes the year in which the women were admitted to practice law (in parentheses). Also included are the first women in their country to achieve a certain distinction such as obtaining a law degree.

KEY
 FRA = Overseas region of France
 GBR = British overseas territory of the United Kingdom
SOM = Self-declared state in Somalia
TZN = Autonomous administrative division of Tanzania

Algeria 

 Blanche Azoulay (1908): First female lawyer in Algeria (upon being called to the Bar of Algiers)
 Belmihoub Aziz: First female judge in Algeria (c. 1962)
Nadia Hammadi: First female appointed as a Judge of the High Court of Algeria (c. 1963–1964)
Fatiha Sahraoui and Meriem Belmihoub-Zerdani (1964): First indigenous female lawyers in Algeria (upon being called to the Bar of Algiers) 
Fafa Ben Zarrouki: First female to serve as the President of an Algerian Court (1975) 
Ghania Lebied: First female to serve as a member of the Constitutional Council of Algeria (1999) 
Kaddache Ghania: First female appointed as an Attorney General in Algeria (2008) 
Chafika Bensaoula: First Algerian female to serve as a Judge of the African Court on Human and Peoples' Rights (2017)

Angola 

 Maria do Carmo Medina (1948): First female lawyer in Angola. She was also the first (female) Vice President of the then newly-created Supreme Court of Angola (1990).
Efigénia Mariquinha dos Santos Lima Clemente (1985), Maria Immaculate Lourenço da Conceição Neto (1988), and Luzia Bebiana de Almeida Sebastião (1991): First females appointed as Judges of the Constitutional Court of Angola (2008)
Exalgina Gambôa: First female to serve as the President of the Angolan Court of Auditors (2018)
Laurinda Cardoso: First female to serve as the President of the Constitutional Court of Angola (2021)

Benin 

 Hélène Aholou Keke (1974): First female lawyer in Benin
 Elisabeth Ekoué Pognon (b. 1937) (c. 1962): First female to become a judge, Judge of the Supreme Court of Benin (c. 1970s), and Judge and President of the Constitutional Court of Benin (1993)
Victorie Agbanrin-Elisha: First female prosecutor in Benin (1981)
Clotilde Medegan-Nougbode: First female to serve as the President of the High Court of Benin (2003)
Reine Alapini-Gansou (b. 1956) (1986): First Beninise female appointed as a Judge of the International Criminal Court (2017)
Ismath Bio Tchané Mamadou: First (female) President of the Court of Auditors of Benin (2021)

Botswana 

 Unity Dow (b. 1959) (1983): First female to study law in Botswana and become a judge (upon her appointment to the High Court of Botswana in 1998). She later became the first female to sit on the Constitutional Court of Botswana.
 Memooda Ebrahim-Carstens: First Botswanan female appointed as a Judge of the specialized Industrial Court of Botswana (1994)
 Athaliah Molokomme (b. 1959) (1981): First female Attorney General of Botswana (2005)
Sanji Mmasenono Monageng (b. 1950): First Motswana female appointed as a Judge of the International Criminal Court (2009–2018)

Burkina Faso 

 Kouma Emilienne Caboret (née Ilboudo): First female judge in Burkina Faso (1969; when the country was known as Upper Volta). She was also the first female to serve as the President of the High Judicial Court of Burkina Faso (1989).
 Antoinette Ouédraogo (1984): First female lawyer in Burkina Faso. She later became the first female Bâtonnier of the Burkina Faso Bar Association (2006).
Ramata Fofana: First female to serve as the President of a Court of Appeals in Burkina Faso (Bobo-Dioulasso Court of Appeal, 1989–1992; Court of Appeal of Ouagadougou, 1999–2001)
Anne Konate and Jeanne Some: First females appointed as members of the Constitutional Council of Burkina Faso (2002)
 Thérèse Traoré: First female to serve as the President of the Court of Cassation of Burkina Faso (2014)

Burundi  

 Dévote Sabuwanka: First female to serve as a member of the Constitutional Court of Burundi (1992)
 Espérance Musirimu (1995): First female lawyer to register with the Burundi Bar Association
Domitille Barancira and Christine Nzeyimana: First female justices to serve as the President of the Constitutional Court of Burundi (1998–2006 and 2007–2013 respectively)
Aimée Kanyana: First female to serve as the Ombudsman for the Republic of Burundi (2022)

Cameroon 

Miriam Weledji (1968): First female lawyer in Cameroon
Alice Nkom (1971): First French-speaking female lawyer in Cameroon
Florence Rita Arrey: First female justice appointed as the Chief Justice of the Court of Appeal in Cameroon (1990). She was also the first female appointed as the Prosecutor of the Court of First Instance (1974). She became the first female to serve as a Judge of the Supreme Court of Cameroon (2000). In 2018, she became the first female to become a member of the Constitutional Council of Cameroon.
 Aimée Ngounou Tchokontheiu: First female to be appointed as the Attorney General of a Court of Appeal in Cameroon (2010). She later became the first female appointed as the Attorney General of the Special Criminal Court of Cameroon (2015)
 Ntyam Mengue: First Cameroonian (female) to serve as a Judge of the African Court on Human and Peoples' Rights (2016)
Annie Noëlle Bahounoui Batende: First female to serve as the President of the Special Criminal Court of Cameroon (2020)
Claire Atangana-Bikouna: First female to serve as the (Interim) President of the Cameroon Bar Association (2020)

Cape Verde 

 Evelyse de Melo Monteiro: First female lawyer in Cape Verde
 Vera Duarte: First female to serve as a magistrate in Cape Verde (1977) and Judge of the Supreme Court of Justice of Cape Verde
 Lígia Lubrino Dias Fonseca (1989): First Bastonária of the Cape Verde Bar Association (Ordem dos Advogados de Cabo Verde) from 2001–2004. She became First Lady of Cape Verde in 2011.
 Maria de Fátima Coronel: First female appointed as the President of the Supreme Court of Justice of Cape Verde (2015)

Central African Republic 

 Thérèse Dejean (c. 1970s): First female magistrate in the Central African Republic
Danièle Darlan, Clémentine Fanga Napala, Sylvia Pauline Yawet Kengueleoua, and Marie Serra: First females to serve as members of the Constitutional Court of the Central African Republic (2013). In 2017, Darlan became the first female elected President of the Constitutional Court.
Adelaïde Dembélé and Emmanuelle Ducos: First females appointed as members of the Special Criminal Court of the Central African Republic (2017). In 2018, Ducos was elected as the first (female) Vice-President of the Special Criminal Court.

Chad 

 Ngonyam Béradinfar: First female magistrate in Chad (1983)
 Nadingar Ekoue Thérèse (1992), Jacqueline Moudeina (1995), and Delphine Djiraibe (c. 1995): First female lawyers in Chad respectively
 Ruth Yaneko Romba: First female to serve as an Advisor (Councilor) on the Supreme Court of Chad (2000)
Agnès Ildjima Lokiam: First female to serve as a member of the Constitutional Council of Chad (2002)

Comoros 

 Harimia Ahmed: First female lawyer in Comoros
 Zamzam Ismaël: First female to serve as a public prosecutor in Comoros (2012)

Democratic Republic of the Congo 

 Mrs. Collin (1944): First female lawyer to register with the Bar of Léopoldville (now Kinshasa) in the Belgian Congo [former name of the Democratic Republic of the Congo]
 Guizela "Gisèle" Malanda: First female magistrate in the Democratic Republic of the Congo (1968)
Ntumba Kaja: First female lawyer to become a Bâtonnier in the Democratic Republic of the Congo (2014) [upon her appointment in the Lubumbashi Bar; Haut-Katanga Province]
Jeanne Mobele Bomana and Delphine Banza Nsengalenge: First females appointed as Advocate Generals of the Constitutional Court of the Democratic Republic of the Congo (2014)
Alphonsine Kalume Asengo Cheusi: First female to serve as a Judge of the Constitutional Court of the Democratic Republic of the Congo (2020)
Marthe Nonde Odio: First female to serve as First President of the Council of State (a federal administrative court) of the Democratic Republic of the Congo (2022)

Djibouti 

 Korane Ahmed Aouled: First Djiboutian woman to start a legal practice in the private sector in Djibouti
Khadija Abeba: First female judge in Djibouti (1977). She is also the first female to serve as President of the High Court of Appeal of Djibouti and the Supreme Court of Djibouti (both in 1996).
Fatouma Mahamoud: First female to serve as the President of the Bar Association of Djibouti (2007)

Egypt 

 Naima Ilyas al-Ayyubi (1933): First female lawyer in Egypt
Mufidah Abdul Rahman: First female lawyer to take cases to the Court of Cassation in Egypt, the first woman to practice law in Cairo, Egypt, the first woman to plead a case before a military court in Egypt, and the first woman to plead cases before courts in the south of Egypt
Insaf al-Borai: First female judge in the United Arab Republic (1958; a republic signifying the union of Egypt and Syria from 1958 to 1971)
Tahani al-Gebali: First female judge in Egypt (upon her appointment to the Supreme Constitutional Court of Egypt in 2003)
Aisha Rateb (1955): First female law professor at Cairo University, Egypt (as well as the first in the country)
 Sally al-Saidi: First female appointed as a Judge of the Criminal Court (2009) and the Head of the Court of Cassation of Egypt (2013)
 Dalia al-Namaky: First female appointed as the Chief Judge of the Family Courts in Egypt (2010)
Hasnaa Shaaban Abdullah: First female judge to preside over a court in Egypt (upon her appointment as the President of the Tanta Economic Court in 2018)
Mona Ibrahim Mohamed Tawila: First female to serve as the head of a department of the High Court of Appeal of Egypt (2020)
 Radwa Helmi: First female appointed as a Judge of the Supreme Administrative Court of Egypt (2022)

Equatorial Guinea 

 Ana María Dougan Thomson (1957): One of the practicing female lawyers around the time of Equatorial Guinea's independence in 1968. She later served as the Dean of the Bar Association of Equatorial Guinea (1990).

Eritrea 

 Fozia Hashim: First female appointed as the Chief Justice of the High Court of Eritrea following the country’s declaration of independence in 1991

Eswatini 

Qinisile Mabuza (1978): First female lawyer and prosecutor in Eswatini (formerly Swaziland). She later became the first female judge in 2005 (upon her appointment as Judge of the High Court of Eswatini).
Mumcy Dlamini: First female to serve as the Acting Director of Public Prosecutions in Eswatini (2006)
Lorraine Hlophe and Dumsile Faith Dlamini: First females appointed as Judges of the Industrial Court of Eswatini (2021)

Ethiopia 

 Alexandra Hamawi: First female law graduate in Ethiopia (1966)
 Atsedeweine Tekle (1978): First female judge in Ethiopia (upon her serving on the High Court of Ethiopia and Federal Supreme Court of Ethiopia respectively)
Meaza Ashenafi: First female justice appointed as the President of the Federal Supreme Court of Ethiopia (2018)
Adanech Abebe: First female to serve as the Federal Attorney General of Ethiopia (2020)

Gabon 

 Marylise Issembé: First female lawyer in Gabon (after having registered in Gabon's Libreville Bar). She was the first female to serve as the Interim President of the National Bar of Gabon.
 Rose Francine Rogombé: First female judge in Gabon (1967). She was also the first female to serve as a deputy prosecutor, investigating judge, Vice-President of the Libreville Tribunal de Grande Instance, public prosecutor and advisor to the judicial chamber of the Supreme Court of Gabon.
Marie-Madeleine Mborantsuo: First female justice to serve as the President of the Constitutional Court of Gabon (1991)

Gambia 

 Mariam Jack-Denton (c. 1980s): First female lawyer in The Gambia
 Mary Sey: First female judge in Gambia (upon her appointment to the High Court of The Gambia in the 1990s)
 Amie Bensouda: First female Solicitor General of the Gambia (1990). She was also the first female to serve as President of the Gambia Bar Association.
Hawa Sisay-Sabally: First female Attorney General of the Gambia (1996–1998)
Fatou Bensouda: First African female (Gambia) to serve as the Prosecutor of the International Criminal Court (2011–2021)
 Mabel Agyemang (Ghana Bar, 1987): First female justice appointed as the Chief Justice of the Supreme Court of the Gambia (2013–2014)
 Fatoumata Sowe and Mariama Jatta: First females appointed as Sharia court judges in The Gambia (2022)

Ghana 

 Essi Matilda Forster (1947): First female lawyer in Ghana (then known as Gold Coast) 
Annie Jiagge (1950): First female in Ghana and the Commonwealth of Nations to become a judge (1953)
 Joyce Bamford-Addo (1961): First female Justice of the Supreme Court of Ghana
 Akua Kuenyehia: First Ghanaian female to serve as a Judge and the Vice President of the International Criminal Court (2003)
Sophia Akuffo: First Ghanaian (female) elected to serve as a Judge of the African Court on Human and Peoples' Rights and its President (2006 and 2012 respectively)
 Georgina Theodora Wood (c. 1970s): First female justice appointed as the Chief Justice of the Supreme Court of Ghana (2007)
Betty Mould-Iddrisu (c. 1978): First female (a lawyer) to serve as the Attorney General of Ghana (2009–2011)
Cynthia Lamptey: First (female) Deputy Special Prosecutor of Ghana (2018) and Acting Special Prosecutor of Ghana (2020)

Guinea 

 Fatoumata Binta Diallo (1998): First woman who registered to practice law in the Bar of the Republic of Guinea Conakry (Barreau de la République de Guinée)
Rouguiatou Barry: First female to serve as a member of the Constitutional Court of Guinea (2015)

Guinea-Bissau 

Maria do Céu Monteiro: First female justice elected as the President of the Supreme Court of Justice and the Superior Council of Guinea-Bissau (2004)

Ivory Coast 

 Kwassi Béatrice Cowplli-Boni: First female lawyer in Ivory Coast
 Mazohin Marguerite: First female judge in Ivory Coast
Jacqueline Oble: First female law professor in Ivory Coast and sub-Saharan Africa (upon joining the faculty of the Abidjan Law School during the 1980s)
Martine Tiacoh: First female to serve as a councillor for the Constitutional Council of Ivory Coast (1995–1999)
Chantal Camara: First female justice appointed as the President of the Court of Cassation of Ivory Coast (2019)
Sori Nayé Henriette: First female to serve as the Attorney General of a Court of Appeal in Ivory Coast (upon her appointment to the Court of Appeal of Abidjan in 2022)

Kenya 

 Katharine Hurst: First female prosecutor in the Kenya Colony (1953)
Effie Owuor (c. 1960s): First female judge of Kenya (upon her appointment as a Judge of the High Court in 1982). She was also the first female to be appointed as a state counsel (c. 1960s), magistrate (1971), and Judge of the Court of Appeal (2003) in Kenya.
 Kalpana Rawal (1975): First female lawyer in Kenya (upon her establishment of a law practice in 1975). She later became the first female judge of Asian descent in Kenya (2000).
Joyce Nuku Khaminwa: First African female to establish a private practice in Kenya (1978)
Roselyn Naliaka Nambuye: First female to serve as a Principal Magistrate in Kenya (1988)
Raychelle Awuor Omamo: First female to serve as the President of the Law Society of Kenya (2001)
Abida Ali-Aroni: First Muslim female appointed as a Judge of the High Court in Kenya (2009)
Joyce Aluoch: First Kenyan (female) to serve as a Judge of the International Criminal Court (2009)
Nancy Makokha Baraza: First female to serve as the Deputy Chief Justice of the Supreme Court of Kenya (2011)
Caroline Tegeret (2021): First female Ogiek lawyer in Kenya 
Philomena Mwilu: First female to serve as the Acting Chief Justice of Supreme Court of Kenya (2021)
Martha Koome: First female to serve as the Chief Justice of the Supreme Court of Kenya (2021)

Lesotho 

Kelello Justina Mafoso-Guni: First female lawyer and Judge of the High Court in Lesotho
 'Neile Alina 'Mantoa Fanana (1980): First woman to hold the post of ombudsman in Lesotho (2010)
 Nthomeng Majara (1997): First female justice appointed as the Chief Justice of the High Court of Lesotho (2014)
 Hlalefang Motinyane: First female appointed as the Acting Director of Public Prosecutions for Lesotho (2017)

Liberia 

 Angie Brooks (1953): First female lawyer in Liberia. She was also the first female to serve as the Assistant Attorney General of Liberia (1953) and a Justice of the Supreme Court of Liberia (1977).
 Emma Shannon Walser (1969): First female judge in Liberia (upon her appointment as a Judge of the Circuit Court of Liberia in 1971) 
Amymusu K. Jones: First female magistrate in Liberia (upon her appointment to the Monrovia City Magisterial Court in 1994). She was also the first female to serve as a Judge of the Fifth Judicial Circuit Court in Grand Cape Mount County, Liberia (c. 2006). 
 Frances Johnson-Morris: First female justice appointed as the Chief Justice of the Supreme Court of Liberia (1996–1997)
Charlene Aimesa Reeves: First female to serve as the Solicitor General for Liberia

Libya 

 Karima El Hadi Turki: First female lawyer in Libya
 Rafia al-Obeidi and Fatima al-Barasi: First female judges in Libya (upon their appointment to the Benghazi Court of First Instance in 1989)
Fatima al-Barasi: First female appointed to the Supreme Judicial Council of Libya (2011)
Wedad Al-Hamali: First female elected to the Supreme Judicial Council of Libya (2014)

Madagascar 

 Berthe Raharijaona: First female lawyer in Madagascar
 Isabelle Razafintsalama: First female public prosecutor in Madagascar
Emilie Radaody-Ralarosy: First female appointed as a councilor (judge) of the Supreme Court of Madagascar (1965)
Arlette Ramaroson: First Malagasy female to serve as an international court judge (upon her appointment to the International Criminal Tribunal for Rwanda in 2001) 
Fanirisoa Ernaivo: First female elected as the President of the Union of Magistrates of Madagascar (2016)
Annick Tsiazonangoly: First female appointed as a member of the High Court of Justice of Madagascar (2018)
Chantal Razafinarivo: First female to serve as the Bâtonnier (President) of the Madagascar Bar Association (2019)

Malawi 

 Vera Chirwa (1959): First female lawyer in Malawi
 Anastasia Msosa (1975): First female appointed as a Judge of the Supreme Court of Appeals (1992–1997), Judge of the High Court (1993–1998), and Chief Justice (2013–2015)
 Chanju Samantha Mwale (c. 2002): First female lawyer (who is a Lieutenant Colonel) in Malawi's army (2004)
Jane Ansah: First female to serve as the Attorney General of Malawi (2006)
Tujilane Chizumila: First female Ombudsman in Malawi (2010), as well as the first female to establish a law firm in Malawi. She is also the first Malawian female to serve as a Judge of the African Court on Human and Peoples' Rights (2017).
Rosemary Kanyuka: First female appointed as the Director of Public Prosecutions in Malawi (2010)

Mali 

 Fatoumata Sylla (1982): First female lawyer in Mali. She later became the first female Bâtonnièr of the Bar Association in Mali (1998–2004).
 Kaïta Kayentao Diallo: First female Justice of the Peace in Mali (1985). She is also the first female appointed as the President of the Supreme Court of Mali (2006).
Amina Mallé Sanogo: First Malian female to serve as a Judge of the Court of Justice of the Economic Community of West African States (2001)
Fatoumata Dembélé Diarra: First Malian (female) to serve as a Judge of the International Criminal Court (2003)
 Manassa Danioko: First female appointed as the President of the Constitutional Court of Mali (2015). She was also the first female appointed as the Attorney General of Mali (1995).

Mauritania 

 Fatimata M'Baye (c. 1985): First female lawyer in Mauritania
 Amamah Bint Cheikh Sidya: First female judge in Mauritania (2013)
Tekber Mint Oudeika: First female judge to serve as the president of a court in Mauritania (upon her appointment as President of the Labor Court in 2018). In 2015, she became the first female to serve as a Judge of the Commercial Court of the Mauritanian capital.
Aisha Mint Ahmed (2021): First Haratin female lawyer in Mauritania

Mauritius 

 Laure Pillay (1955): First female lawyer in Mauritius. She later became the first female magistrate in Mauritius (1967).
 Saheda Peeroo (1972): First Muslim female lawyer in Mauritius
Shirin Aumeeruddy-Cziffra: First female (a lawyer) to become the Attorney General in Mauritius (1982–1983)
 Vidya Narayan: First female appointed as a Justice of the Supreme Court of Mauritius (1993)
Narghis Bundhun: First female to serve as the President of the Mauritius Bar Association (2000)
Rehana Bibi Mungly-Gulbul: First female who will serve as the Chief Judge of the Supreme Court of Mauritius (2021)

Mayotte (FRA) 

Fatima Ousseni (c. 1997): First female lawyer in Mayotte
Gracieuse Lacoste-Etcheverry: First female appointed as the President of the Court of Appeal of Saint-Denis (2015) [jurisdiction over Mayotte and Réunion]
Christiane Féral-Schuhl: First female to serve as the President of the Conseil National des Barreaux (CNB) in Mayotte (2019)
Fabienne Atzori: First female to serve as the Attorney General of Reunion and Mayotte (2021)

Morocco 

 Hélène Cazès-Benatar (c. 1929): First female lawyer in Morocco
 Zaynab Abd al-Razzaq: First female judge in Morocco (1960)
Zineb El Adaoui: First female appointed as a Judge (1984) and the Head (2021) of the Court of Auditors of Morocco
Amina Benchekroun: First female appointed as a Judge of the Supreme Judicial Council of Morocco (1987)
Saâdia Belmir: First female appointed as a Judge of the Constitutional Council of Morocco (1999)
Laïla Benjelloun: First female judge to serve as the First President of the Court of Appeal of Commerce of Morocco (2000)
Hajibah al-Bukhari: First female appointed as a Judge of the Supreme Judicial Council of Morocco without a quota (2016)
Rahmona Ziani: First female appointed as a Crown Prosecutor (or Attorney General) in Morocco (2018)
Jamila Sedqi: First Moroccan female to serve as a Judge of the Administrative Tribunal of the African Union (AU) (2019) [based in Addis Ababa, Ethiopia]
Rabiha Fath Al-Nur: First female appointed as the chief prosecutor of a court of first instance in Morocco (2021)

Mozambique 

 Noémia Neves Anacleto (c. 1953): First female lawyer in Mozambique
 Gita Honwana Welch: First female judge in Mozambique (sometime between 1978–1989). She is also considered the first female academic lawyer in Mozambique. 
Maria Noémia Francisco: First female to serve as a Judge of the Supreme Court of Mozambique (1988)
 Luísa Chadraca (c. 1990): First woman to enroll with the Bar Association of Mozambique (Ordem dos Advogados de Moçambique)
 Beatriz da Consolação Mateus Buchili: First female appointed as the Attorney General of Mozambique (2014)
Lúcia Fernanda Buinga Maximiano do Amaral and Lúcia da Luz Ribeiro: First females to serve as Judges of the Constitutional Council of Mozambique (2003). Ribeiro later became the first female to serve as the President of the Constitutional Council of Mozambique in 2019.

Namibia 

 Karen Goldblatt Marshall (1966): First female lawyer (non-native) in Namibia (upon being called to the Bar of Windhoek). She later became the first female judge in Namibia.
Maria Catharina Greeff (c. 1977): First native-born Caucasian female lawyer in Namibia.  She was also the first female conveyance to be admitted in Namibia.
Elize Angula: First female to serve as President of the Law Society of Namibia (2004)
Susan Vivier (1983): First female lawyer to obtain Senior Counsel status in Namibia (2010)
Bience Gawanas (c. 1993): First native-born Namibian female lawyer in Namibia. She was also the first female appointed as the Head of the Office of the Namibian Ombudsman (1996–2003).
 Mavis Gibson: First female appointed as a Judge of the High Court of Namibia (1995)
 Pendukeni Iivula-Ithana (1999): The only female among 21 members of Namibia Constituent Assembly (1990) and later became the first female Attorney General of Namibia (2001)
 Martha Imalwa: First female appointed as the Prosecutor General of Namibia (2004)

Niger 

 Adji Fati Kountche: First female lawyer in Niger
 Fatimata Bazeye Salifou (1979): First female magistrate in Niger. She later became the first female appointed as the President of the Constitutional Court of Niger (2007).
Eliane J. Allagbada: First female to serve as the President of the Court of Accounts of Niger (2010). She was also the first female to serve as a Judge of the Court of First Instance of Niamey.
Hadiza Moussa Gros: First female to serve as the President of the High Court of Justice of Niger (2011)
Aissata Zada: First female to serve as the President of the Niger Bar Association (c. 2013)

Nigeria 

 Stella Thomas (1935): First female lawyer in Nigeria. She later became the first female magistrate in Nigeria (1943).
 Modupe Omo-Eboh (1952): First female judge in Nigeria (upon her appointment as a Judge of the High Court in Nigeria in 1969)
 Folake Solanke (1962): First female lawyer in Nigeria to become Senior Advocate of Nigeria and Senior Counsel (1981)
 Victoria Ayodele Uzoamaka Onejeme (1965): First female to become an Attorney General in the history of Nigeria (1978)
 Dora Wilson-Ekwo: First female lawyer (who is a Lieutenant Colonel) in the Nigerian Armed Forces (c. 1993)
 Rosaline Omotosho (1961): First female to serve as a chief judge in Nigeria (1995)
 Hauwa Ibrahim (1996): First Muslim female lawyer in Nigeria
Roseline Ukeje (1971): First female justice appointed as the Chief Judge of the Federal High Court in Nigeria (2001)
Hansine N. Donli: First Nigerian female to serve as a Judge of the Court of Justice of the Economic Community of West African States (2001)
 Aloma Mariam Mukhtar (1967): First female appointed as a Justice of the Supreme Court of Nigeria and its Chief Justice (2009–2014). She was also the first female lawyer in Northern Nigeria, as well as the first female Judge of the Kano High Court, Nigeria. 
 Elsie Nwanwuri Thompson: First Nigerian (female) to serve as a Judge of the African Court on Human and Peoples' Rights (2010) 
Zainab Bulkachuwa: First female judge to serve as the President of the Court of Appeals of Nigeria (2014)

Republic of the Congo 

 Agathe Pembellot (France Bar; 1969): First female magistrate in the Republic of the Congo (1973), as well as the first female member of the Supreme Court of the Republic of the Congo (1982)
Julienne Ondziel-Gnelenga (1982): First female lawyer in the Republic of the Congo, as well as the first female to serve as a Bâtonnier
Delphine Edith Emmanuel Adouki: First female to serve as a member of the Constitutional Court of the Republic of the Congo (2003)
Yvonne Kimbembe: First female to serve as the Attorney General of the Court of Auditors and Budgetary Discipline of the Republic of the Congo (2009)

Réunion (FRA) 

Marie Colardeau (1930): First female lawyer in Réunion
Fernande Anilha: First female to serve as the President of the Saint-Denis Bar Association in Réunion (1994)
Gracieuse Lacoste-Etcheverry: First female appointed as the President of the Court of Appeal of Saint-Denis (2015) [jurisdiction over Mayotte and Réunion]
Valérie Lebreton: First female to serve as the President of the Tribunal de Grande of Saint-Pierre (2019) [jurisdiction over Réunion]
Fabienne Atzori: First female to serve as the Attorney General of Reunion and Mayotte (2021)

Rwanda 

 Agnes Mukabaranga (1994): First woman that registered to practice law in the Rwanda Bar Association
 Immaculée Nyirinkwaya: First female appointed as a Justice of the Supreme Court of Rwanda (1995)
 Navanethem Pillay: First female to serve as a Judge of the International Criminal Tribunal for Rwanda (1995)
 Louise Arbour: First female to serve as the Chief Prosecutor of the International Criminal Tribunal for Rwanda (1996)
 Marie-Josée Mukandamage: First female to serve as the President of the Court of Auditors of Rwanda (1999)
 Aloysia Cyanzayire: First female justice elected as the Chief Justice of the Supreme Court of Rwanda (2003)
 Marie Thérèse Mukamulisa: First Rwandan female to serve as a Judge of the African Court on Human and Peoples' Rights (2016)

Saint Helena, Ascension and Tristan da Cunha (GBR) 
Jane Hamilton-White: First female appointed as the Public Solicitor for Saint Helena, Ascension and Tristan da Cunha (2006)

São Tomé and Príncipe 

 Alice Vera Cruz: First female judge and President of the Supreme Court of São Tomé and Príncipe (2001)
Celiza de Deus Lima: First female to serve as the Bastonária of the São Tomé and Príncipe Bar Association (2012–2014)
Kótia Solange do Espírito Santos Menezes: First female elected as a Judge of the Constitutional Court of São Tomé and Príncipe (2018)

Senegal 

 Mame Bassine Niang (1975): First female lawyer in Senegal
 Marie José Crespin: First female judge in Senegal
 Dior Fall Sow (1968): First female prosecutor in Senegal (upon her appointment to the Republic at the Court of First Instance of Saint-Louis in 1976)
Andresia Vaz: First female judge to serve as the First President of the Court of Cassation of Senegal (1997–2001). She is also the first female to serve as the President of the Court of Appeal of Dakar, Senegal (2004).
Mireille Ndiaye: First female to serve as the Attorney General of the Court of Cassation of Senegal (2001) and President of the Constitutional Council of Senegal (2002)
Zeynab Mbengue: First female to serve as a Magistrate of the Court of Accounts of Senegal

Seychelles 

 Danielle Rasool (c. 1970s): Reputed to be the first female lawyer in Seychelles
 Mathilda Twomey (1987): First female judge in Seychelles. She is also the first female justice appointed as the Chief Justice of the Supreme Court of Seychelles (2015).
 Fiona Robinson: First female appointed as a Justice of the Supreme Court of Seychelles (2013)

Sierra Leone 

 Frances Claudia Wright (1943): First female lawyer in Sierra Leone
 Agnes Macaulay (1956): First female judge in Sierra Leone (c. 1970)
 Patricia Macaulay: First female appointed as a Justice of the Supreme Court of Sierra Leone (c. 1994)
 Renate Winter: First female to serve as a Judge of the Special Court for Sierra Leone (2002)
 Umu Hawa Tejan-Jalloh (c. 1970s): First female justice appointed as the Chief Justice of the Supreme Court of Sierra Leone (2008)
Priscilla Schwartz: First female appointed as the Attorney General in Sierra Leone (2018)
Eddinia Michaela Swallow: First female to serve as the Vice President and President of the Sierra Leone Bar Association (2020)
Miatta Maria Samba: First Sierra Leonean (female) to serve as a Judge of the International Criminal Court (2021)

Somalia 

 Caasha-Kin Duale (1979): First female lawyer in Somalia 
Samira Hussein Daud: One of the first six female prosecutors in Somalia (2015)
Khadra Hussein Mohammad: First female judge in Somalia

Somaliland (SOM) 

 Ifrah Aden Omar: First practicing female lawyer in Somaliland
 Khadra Hussein Mohammad: First female lawyer to become the National Deputy Prosecutor in Somaliland (2014)
 Aswan Harmud: First female lawyer to become the Prosecutor of Somaliland (2015)

South Africa 

 Madeline Wookey: In 1909, Wookey began fighting for the right to practice law in South Africa. She lost her case at the appellate level in 1912. 
Frances Lyndall Schreiner: First female law graduate in South Africa (1914)
Constance Mary Hall (1926): First female lawyer in South Africa
Gladys Steyn, Irene Antoinette Geffen, and Bertha Solomon (1926): First female advocates in South Africa 
Olga Brink: First female magistrate in South Africa (1962) 
 Leonora van den Heever (1952): First female judge in South Africa (1969). She was also the first female to become Senior Counsel in South Africa.
 Navanethem Pillay (1967): First Tamil-Indian female appointed as a Judge of the High Court of South Africa (1995)
 Zainunnisa "Cissie" Gool (1963) and Desiree Finca (1967): First Black female lawyers respectively in South Africa 
 Yvonne Mokgoro (1987) and Kate O'Regan: First females appointed as Justices of the Constitutional Court of South Africa (1994). Mokgoro is also known as the first Black female judge in South Africa.
 Lucy Mailula: First Black female appointed as a Judge of the High Court of South Africa (1995)
 Mandisa Maya: First female (and Black female) appointed as President of the Supreme Court of Appeal of South Africa (2017) and Deputy Chief Justice of South Africa (Constitutional Court of South Africa; 2022)
Shamila Batohi: First female to serve as the Director of the National Prosecuting Authority of South Africa (2018)

Sudan 

 Sania Mustafa (c. 1960s): First female lawyer in Sudan
 Ihsan Mohamed Fakhri: First female judge in Sudan (1965). She later became the first female appointed as a Judge of the Supreme Court of Sudan.
 Nagwa Kamal Farid: First female appointed as a Judge of the Shari'a Court in Sudan (1970)
 Nemat Abdullah Khair: First female Chief Justice/President of the Supreme Court of Sudan (2019)

Tanzania 

 Julie Manning: First female lawyer in Tanzania. She later became the first female judge (upon her appointment as a Judge of the High Court of Tanzania in 1974).
Suad Al-Lamkia: First female lawyer to work for the Tanzanian Public Prosecution (1971-1972)
 Eusebia Munuo: First female to serve as a Justice of the Court of Appeal of Tanzania
Joaquine De Mello: First female to serve as the President of the Tanganyika Law Society (2007-2008)

Togo 

 Acouetey Massan Lorette: First female lawyer in Togo
 Biyémi Brigitte Brym-Kekeh: First female magistrate in Togo (c. 1960s)
 Sylvia Aquereburu: First female notary in Togo (1981)
Awa Nana Daboya: First Togolese female to serve as a Judge of the Court of Justice of the Economic Community of West African States (2001)
Edwige Ablavi Hohoueto: First female appointed as a Judge of the Constitutional Court of Togo (2007)
Evelyne Afiwa Hohoeto: First Togolese female elected as a Judge at the Common Court of Justice and Arbitration of the Organization for the Harmonization in Africa of Business Law (2018)
Justine Azanlédji-Ahadzi: First female to serve as the Attorney General of the Supreme Court of Togo (2022)

Tunisia 

 Juliette Smaja Zerah (1916): First female (who was of Jewish descent) lawyer in Tunisia
Amna Aouij: First female magistrate in Tunisia (1966)
 Emma Chtioui and Joudeh Jijah: First female judges respectively in Tunisia (1968)
 Leila Khadija Zouari Bel Hassan (1970) and Aïda Ajimi (1973): First Muslim female lawyers in Tunisia
 Suzanne Bastid: First female ad hoc judge of the International Court of Justice for Tunisia (1982)
Rafiâ Ben Ezzedine: First female judge appointed as the President of a Court of Appeal in Tunisia
 Faouzia Ben Alaya: First female appointed as the President of the Court of Cassation of Tunisia (2016)

Uganda 

 Princess Elizabeth Christobel Edith Bagaaya Akiiki of Toro (1965): First female lawyer in Uganda
 Laeticia Kikonyogo (1968): First female magistrate in Uganda (upon being appointed to Grade I from 1971 to 1973). She was also the first female Chief Magistrate (1973–1986), Judge of the High Court of Uganda (1986), Justice of the Supreme Court of Uganda (1997) and Deputy Chief Justice of Uganda (2001-2010 after having served as a Judge of the Court of Appeal of Uganda/Constitutional Court of Uganda).
Rebecca Kadaga: First female lawyer to open a private practice firm in Uganda (c. 1980s)
Solomy Balungi Bossa: First female to lead the Uganda Law Society (1993)
 Julia Sebutinde (1978): First Ugandan female appointed as a Judge of the Special Court for Sierra Leone (2005) and a Judge of the International Court of Justice (2012)
 Priscilla Schwartz: First female appointed as the Attorney General in Sierra Leone (2018)
 Florence Ndagire (2009): First female lawyer with visual impairment in Uganda
 Jane Frances Abodo: First female to serve as the Director of Public Prosecutions in Uganda (2020)

Zambia 

 Phyllis Mackendrick (c. 1928): First female lawyer in Rhodesia admitted to the High Court [former name of Zambia and Zimbabwe]
 J. J. McGrowther (c. 1950s): First female barrister admitted to the bars in Northern Rhodesia [former name of Zambia] and Southern Rhodesia [former name of Zimbabwe]
Lombe P. Chibesakunda (1969): First Zambian female lawyer and first female Solicitor General (1973) in Zambia. She was the first female to serve as Acting Chief Justice of Zambia (2012–2015).
 Florence Mumba (1973): First female judge in Zambia (upon her appointment as a Judge of the High Court of Zambia in 1980). She and Lombe P. Chibesakunda were the first females appointed to the Supreme Court of Zambia in 1998. 
 Irene Mambilima: First female to serve as the Deputy Chief Justice (2008-2015) and Chief Justice of the High Court of Zambia (2015–2021) 
Hildah Chibomba, Mugeni Mulenga, and Anne Sitali: First females to serve as Judges of the Constitutional Court of Zambia (2016). Chimbomba was also the first female to serve as President of the Constitutional Court of Zambia. 
 Lillian Fulata Shawa: First female to serve as the Director of Public Prosecutions in Zambia (2016)
 Linda Kasonde: First female elected as the President of the Law Society of Zambia (2016)

Zanzibar (TZN) 

 Suad Al-Lamkia: First Zanzibari-born female to become a lawyer, though she was unsuccessful in establishing her own legal practice due to the Zanzibar Revolution
 Janet Sekihola: First female appointed as a Primary Court Magistrate in Zanzibar (c. 1980s)
 Salma Ali Hassan Khamis and Mwanamkaa Abdulrahman Mohammed: First females to serve as the Director and Deputy Director respectively of the Office of Public Prosecutions in Zanzibar (2021)

Zimbabwe 

 Phyllis Mackendrick (c. 1928): First female lawyer in Rhodesia admitted to the High Court [former name of Zambia and Zimbabwe]
 J. J. McGrowther (c. 1950s): First female barrister admitted to the bars in Northern Rhodesia [former name of Zambia] and Southern Rhodesia [former name of Zimbabwe]
 Kelello Justina Mafoso-Guni: First female magistrate in Zimbabwe (1980)
 Thérèse Striggner Scott: First female appointed as a Judge of the High Court of Zimbabwe (c. 1983)
 Vernanda Ziyambi: First female appointed as a Justice of the Supreme Court of Zimbabwe (2001)
Rita Makarau: First female appointed as the Judge President of the High Court of Zimbabwe (2006)
Anne-Marie Gowora, Elizabeth Gwaunza, Antonia Guvava, Rita Makarau and Susan Mavangira: First females to serve as Judges of the Constitutional Court of Zimbabwe (2013)
Vimbai Nyemba: First female President of the Law Society of Zimbabwe (2015)
Elizabeth Gwaunza: First female appointed as the Deputy Chief Justice (2018) and Acting Chief Justice (2021) of the Supreme Court of Zimbabwe

See also 

Justice ministry
List of first women lawyers and judges by nationality
 List of first women lawyers and judges in Asia
 List of first women lawyers and judges in Europe
 List of first women lawyers and judges in North America
List of first women lawyers and judges in Oceania
 List of first women lawyers and judges in South America
 List of first women lawyers and judges in the United States
 List of the first women holders of political offices in Africa

References 

Women, Africa
Africa, lawyers
Women, lawyers
Africa
Africa
Women in Africa